Cub Linux was a computer operating system designed to mimic the desktop appearance and functionality of ChromeOS. It was based on Ubuntu Linux LTS 14.04 "Trusty Tahr". It used Openbox as the window manager and tools taken from LXDE, Gnome, XFCE as well as a number of other utilities. It was a cloud-centric operating system that was heavily focused on the Chromium Browser. Cub Linux's tagline was "Cub = Chromium + Ubuntu".

History 
Cub Linux was originally called Chromixium OS. The developer, RichJack, initially announced the project on the Ubuntu user forums on September 19, 2014. Since then, the project released the first stable version, Chromixium 1.0 as a 32 bit live ISO on April 26, 2015. This was followed by a service pack to address a number of issues such as screen tearing and slow menu generation. In July 2015, a number of updates were rolled into a new release, version 1.5. This was initially 32 bit only, but was followed by a 64 bit release in November 2015.

At some point towards the end of 2015, Google, who owns the rights to the ChromeOS and Chromium trademarks, requested that RichJack cease use of the Chromixium mark and related websites and social media presences. On January 17, 2016, RichJack announced that Chromixium would be changing name to Cub Linux with immediate effect and that the Chromixium name would be completely dropped by 31 March 2016.

Towards the end of 2016, the Cub Linux website mysteriously disappeared. Their GitHub page is still open. User d4zzy, who was involved in Cub Linux's development had this to say about its sudden end: "Cub was killed due to private life restrictions - that was all and there was no one at the time to pick it up."

On July 19, 2017, the developer of Feren OS announced that he would be "bringing back Cub" in the form of Phoenix Linux. These plans appear to be on hold due to the success of Feren OS

Receptions 
Jesse Smith from DistroWatch Weekly reviewed Chromixium OS 1.0:

See also 
 SUSE Studio#Notable appliances
 List of Linux distributions#openSUSE-based
 Ubuntu
 ChromeOS
 Chromium Browser

References

External links 
 
 Cub Linux Forum
 Cub Linux at Distrowatch
 Cub Linux source code
 Original Chromixium website
 Chromixium archive and downloads
 Cub Linux archive and downloads
 Phoenix Linux website

Computer-related introductions in 2016
X86-64 Linux distributions
Ubuntu derivatives
Linux distributions